The Chief Justice of Ghana is the highest-ranking judge of the Supreme Court of Ghana. The chief justice is also the head of the Judiciary of Ghana and is responsible for its administration and supervision. In order of state precedence, the chief justice is the fourth highest official in Ghana.

Historical background
The Supreme Court Ordinance of 1876 ended the 10-year absence of a Supreme Court, establishing a Supreme Court of Judicature for the Gold Coast Colony. The court consisted of the chief justice and not more than four puisne judges. This led to the appointment of the first chief justice, Sir David Patrick Chalmers by the British colonial authorities in 1876. The nature of the office of chief justice evolved with the years. The 1954 Gold Coast constitution provided for the chief justice to be appointed on the advice of the prime minister while other judges and judicial officers were appointed on the advice of the Judicial Service Commission. Under the 1957 Ghana constitution, on the attainment of independence, the chief justice and all superior justices were appointed on the advice of the prime minister as the Judicial Service Commission was abolished. Sir Kobina Arku Korsah became the first Ghanaian chief justice. Under the 1969 constitution, the chief justice was appointed by the president acting in consultation with the Council of State. The office has not changed much since the 1979 constitution though the court system underwent a lot of changes under various military governments between 1972 and 1993.

Appointment and office tenure
The chief justice is appointed by the president of Ghana in consultation with the Council of State of Ghana and with the approval of the Parliament of Ghana. A person qualified to be the chief justice of Ghana must be of a high moral character and have proven integrity and must have been a lawyer for at least fifteen years to have been eligible for appointment to the Supreme Court in the first place. Where the office of the chief justice is vacant or the chief justice is incapacitated and unable to carry out his duties, the most senior of the justices of the Supreme Court is expected to act in his place until he is able to resume or a new substantive chief justice is appointed by the president. The chief justice and any other justice of the superior courts may voluntarily retire on reaching the age of 60 years or stay on till the compulsory retiring age of 70 years.

Supreme Court and other superior courts

The Supreme Court consists of the chief justice and at least nine other judges. The chief justice is expected to preside at all sittings of the Supreme Court whenever  present. The chief justice is the most senior member and oversees the administration of the Court of Appeal. The chief justice is also a member and administrator of the High Court and the Regional Tribunals.

Judicial Council
The chief justice is the chairman of the Judicial Council of Ghana. The council is expected to propose judicial reforms to the Ghana government to help improve the level of administration of justice and efficiency in the Judiciary. It is also expected to be a forum to enhance the administration of justice in Ghana.

Other duties
Administer the presidential oath and the vice presidential oaths before parliament prior to both assuming their offices.
Administer the oath of allegiance and the judicial oathto all justices of the superior courts or designate someone to act in his stead.
Chairman of the Rules of Court Committee which makes rules regulating the practice and procedure of all courts in Ghana.
To set up a tribunal to resolve grievances against the Electoral Commission of Ghana.
Convene and chair a tribunal to oversee proceedings relating to the removal of the president of Ghana from office.
Appoint judicial officers on the advice of the Judicial Council and subject to the approval of the president.

Current Chief Justice

The current chief justice is Kwasi Anin-Yeboah. He succeeded Sophia Akuffo as the first male chief justice of Ghana in twelve years.
Anin-Yeboah was sworn in as Chief Justice by President Akufo-Addo on 7 January 2020.

Early Chief Justices (and Judicial Assessors)
1853–?1854 James Coleman Fitzpatrick 
1854–1857 Henry Connor 
1861–1866 William Hackett  (acting 1861–1863) 
1868 William Alexander Parker

Chief Justices of the Supreme Court
Since its inception in 1876, the Supreme Court has had 27 chief justices, including 13 in the Gold Coast era.

Justice Francis Yaonasu Kpegah, the most senior of the Supreme Court judges acted as Chief Justice between March 2007 and June 2007.

Demographics

See also
Judiciary of Ghana
Supreme Court of Ghana
List of judges of the Supreme Court of Ghana

Notes 

 The Supreme Court was left intact under this military regime. See.

References

External links
List of Judges of the Superior Court of Judicature
Chapter 11 of the 1992 Ghana constitution:The Judiciary

 
Judiciary of Ghana